Exmouth Community College is an academy in Exmouth, Devon, England. The college provides secondary education for 2000 plus students aged 11 to 18. The principal is Andrew Davis.

History

Grammar school/Secondary Modern School
Exmouth Grammar School and Secondary Modern Schools were combined to create the comprehensive school in 1967.

Comprehensive
It became a comprehensive in 1967. In the early 1970s it was the largest school in England, with 2470. In 2008 it was the third largest after Nottingham Academy,  and Ashfield Comprehensive School.

Curriculum
The college has taught computer studies at GCSE and A Level for a number of years. As well as offering the core curriculum with a choice between academic and vocational subjects, the college also offers an alternative curriculum, focusing entirely on workplace skills. The options available at Key Stage 4 are extensive, and include everything from Computer Science to Health and Care.

Ofsted 
The school's most recent full Ofsted inspection was in October 2017, with the most recent School inspection visit in February 2020. All of the reports since November 2017 have cited that the school requires improvement in its overall effectiveness as a school.

Sites
The college has two sites, on Gipsy Lane and Green Close, connected by a secured bridge and pathway through parkland: approx. 200m. The Green Close site is primarily for Key Stage 3 (years 7 to 9) while the Gipsy Lane site caters for Key Stage 4 (years 10 to 11) and sixth form (Post-16). Both sites have undergone rapid development, with the Turner Building (1997) and Pauline Hitchings Building (2005) opening on the Green Close site and the Judith Telfer Centre (1997) and The Maths Block on the Gipsy Lane site (2016). Further major development will take place 2018-2020

The college is equipped with 900 workstations, many of which are in one of the twelve IT suites.

Notable former pupils
 Simon Quarterman, actor
 Alistair Brammer, actor
 Jonathan Glanfield, Olympic sailor and silver medalist
 Kevin Hill, former professional footballer with Torquay United, leading the list of appearances for the club. 1997–2008
 David Quantick, comedy writer and music magazine reviewer
 Wing Commander Nikki Thomas (1991–1996), the first female Wing Commander in the RAF, and the first female commander of an RAF fast jet squadron.
 Matthew Wood, professional cricketer with Nottinghamshire

Exmouth Grammar School
 Patricia Beer, poet
 Squadron Leader Bill Langworthy AFC, pilot with the Red Arrows in 1966, and Red Pelicans from 1964–65
 Group Captain Bill Randle CBE AFC DFM FRAeS

References

External links 
 Exmouth Community College

Secondary schools in Devon
Exmouth
Academies in Devon